Marita Helena Ulvskog (born 4 September 1951) is a Swedish politician who served as Member of the European Parliament from 2009 until 2019. She is a member of the Social Democrats, part of the Progressive Alliance of Socialists and Democrats.

Early career
Ulvskog is a trained journalist and she worked for several years on the Journal of the Swedish Trade Union Confederation.

Member of the Swedish Parliament, 1998–2009
Ulvskog was a member of the Parliament of Sweden from 1998 to 2009. During that time, she was the Minister for Civil Service Affairs from 1994 to 1996 and Minister for Culture in the minority government led by Prime Minister Göran Persson from 1996 to 2004. She also served as the party secretary of the Social Democrats from 2004 to 2009.

Member of the European Parliament, 2009–2019
On 30 September 2008 it was revealed that Ulvskog would lead the Social Democrats in the 2009 European Parliament election although she during the 90's was involved in the critical debate on EU. She was elected with the strong support of personal votes and now serves as a Member of the European Parliament (MEP).

In Parliament, Ulvskog served as vice chair of the Committee on Employment and Social Affairs from 2014 until 2019. She was also a member of the Committee on Transport and Tourism. From 2009 until 2014, she served on the Committee on Industry, Research and Energy.

In addition to her committee assignments, Ulvskog serves ad a member of the European Parliament Intergroup on Western Sahara and the European Parliament Intergroup on the Welfare and Conservation of Animals.

Ulvskog was one of the four vice presidents of the Party of European Socialists, under the leadership of chairman Sergei Stanishev.

Other activities
 Olof Palme International Center, Chair of the Board (2017-2018)

References

External links
Marita Ulvskog at the Riksdag website

1951 births
Living people
People from Luleå Municipality
Sommar (radio program) hosts
Swedish feminists
Swedish Ministers for Culture
Swedish Ministers for Gender Equality
Swedish Social Democratic Party MEPs
Women members of the Riksdag
Women government ministers of Sweden
Members of the Riksdag 1998–2002
Members of the Riksdag 2002–2006
Members of the Riksdag 2006–2010
MEPs for Sweden 2009–2014
MEPs for Sweden 2014–2019
21st-century women MEPs for Sweden
21st-century Swedish women politicians
Socialist feminists